Jessie Bates III (born February 26, 1997) is an American football safety for the Atlanta Falcons of the National Football League (NFL). He played college football at Wake Forest, and was drafted by the Cincinnati Bengals in the second round of the 2018 NFL Draft.

Early years
Bates attended Snider High School in Fort Wayne, Indiana. Along with football, he also played basketball. He originally committed to play college football for the Toledo Rockets, but he flipped his commitment to the Wake Forest Demon Deacons in February 2015.  Bates is the son of his single mother Theresa and has 6 siblings, his older sister Aaliyah, his younger brother Von and step-siblings Donavan, Nate, Kameron and Ariana.

College career
Bates did not play as a true freshman at Wake Forest in 2015 and chose to redshirt.

As a redshirt freshman in 2016, Bates played in all 13 of Wake Forest's games. He returned 18 punts for 73 yards along with tallying five interceptions (two returned for touchdowns), 100 tackles (3.5 for loss), four pass deflections and one forced fumble. After the season, he was named to the USA Today Freshman All-America Team, the All-ACC Second-team, and to the ACC All-Freshman First-team.

In 2017, as a redshirt sophomore, Bates played in 11 of Wake Forest's 13 games, missing two due to injury. In those 11 games, he returned eight punts for 161 yards and one touchdowns along with recording 79 tackles (six for loss), five pass deflections and one forced fumble. After the season, he declared for the 2018 NFL Draft.

Professional career
On January 4, 2018, Bates announced his decision to forgo his remaining eligibility and enter the 2018 NFL Draft. He attended the NFL Scouting Combine in Indianapolis and completed the majority of combine drills, but opted to skip the bench press. Bates performed well and finished third among safeties in the 60-yard shuttle, fourth among safeties in three-cone drill, and fifth among safeties in the short shuttle. He also earned the ninth best time among his position group in the 40-yard dash and had the tenth best vertical jump.

On March 13, 2018, Bates participated at Wake Forest's pro day and performed the bench press and short shuttle (4.25s). He attended pre-draft visits with multiple teams, including the Tennessee Titans, Pittsburgh Steelers, Detroit Lions, and Carolina Panthers. At the conclusion of the pre-draft process, Bates was projected to a second or third round pick by NFL draft experts and scouts. He was ranked as the third best free safety prospect in the draft by DraftScout.com, the fourth best safety in the draft by NFL analyst Mike Mayock, and was also ranked as the fifth best safety by Sports Illustrated.

Cincinnati Bengals
The Cincinnati Bengals selected Bates in the second round (54th overall) of the 2018 NFL Draft. Bates was the fourth safety drafted in 2018.

On May 12, 2018, the Cincinnati Bengals signed Bates to a four-year, $4.94 million contract that includes $2.38 million guaranteed and a signing bonus of $1.67 million.

2018

Bates entered training camp slated as a backup safety, but earned an opportunity to compete for the job as the starting free safety against George Iloka after quickly impressing the Bengals' coaching staff. Head coach Marvin Lewis named Bates the starting free safety to start the regular season, alongside strong safety Shawn Williams and cornerbacks William Jackson III and Dre Kirkpatrick.

He made his professional regular season debut and first career start in the Cincinnati Bengals’ season opener at the Indianapolis Colts and recorded eight solo tackles in their 34–23 victory. On September 13, 2018, Bates recorded three solo tackles, broke up a pass, and made his first-career interception during a 34–23 victory against the Baltimore Ravens in Week 2. Bates made his first career interception off a pass attempt by Joe Flacco, that was originally intended for wide receiver Michael Crabtree, and returned it for a 21-yard gain in the first quarter. In Week 7, he collected a season-high 12 combined tackles (seven solo) during the Bengals’ 45–10 loss at the Kansas City Chiefs. On October 28, 2018, Bates recorded six solo tackles, two pass deflections, and returned an interception for his first career touchdown during a 37–34 victory against the Tampa Bay Buccaneers in Week 8. Bates intercepted a pass by Buccaneers’ quarterback Jameis Winston, that was intended for wide receiver Adam Humphries, and returned it for a 21-yard touchdown. On December 31, 2018, the Cincinnati Bengals announced their decision to fire head coach Marvin Lewis after the Bengals finished with a 6–10 record. He started all 16 games as a rookie in 2018 and recorded a team-leading 111 combined tackles (73 solo), seven pass deflections, three interceptions, and one touchdown. He received an overall grade of 79.9 from Pro Football Focus, which ranked as the 11th best grade among safeties in 2018.

2019
In week 4 against the Pittsburgh Steelers, Bates recovered a fumble forced by teammate Nick Vigil in the 27–3 loss.
In week 10 against the Baltimore Ravens, Bates recorded his first interception of the season off Robert Griffin III in the 49–13 loss.
In week 11 against the Oakland Raiders, Bates recorded an interception off Derek Carr in the 17–10 loss.
In week 14 against the Cleveland Browns, Bates recorded his third interception of the season off a pass thrown by Baker Mayfield during the 29–17 loss, tying his number of interceptions recorded during his rookie season.

2020
In Week 6 against the Indianapolis Colts, Bates recorded his first interception of the season off a pass thrown by Philip Rivers during the 31–27 loss.
In Week 11 against the Washington Football Team, Bates recorded his third interception of the season off a pass thrown by Alex Smith during the 20–9 loss.

After the season Bates was named a second-team All-Pro.

2021
In Super Bowl LVI, Bates recorded his second career playoff interception, picking off Matthew Stafford in the endzone.

2022
On March 7, 2022, the Bengals placed the franchise tag on Bates, which he signed on August 23.

Atlanta Falcons

2023
On March 16, 2023, Bates signed a four-year, $64.02 million deal with the Atlanta Falcons.

NFL career statistics

References

External links
Wake Forest Demon Deacons bio
Cincinnati Bengals bio

1997 births
Living people
Players of American football from Fort Wayne, Indiana
American football defensive backs
Wake Forest Demon Deacons football players
Cincinnati Bengals players
Atlanta Falcons players